Cristian Alberto Rami  (born 26 January 1980) is an Argentine footballer who holds an Italian passport and plays for Olympiakos Volos in the Greek Beta Ethniki.

Club career
Rami previously played for Talleres de Córdoba in the Primera División de Argentina and Angers in the French Ligue 2.

References

1980 births
Living people
Argentine footballers
Club Almagro players
Talleres de Córdoba footballers
Atlético Tucumán footballers
Racing de Córdoba footballers
Unión de Santa Fe footballers
Tiro Federal footballers
Angers SCO players
Footballers from Córdoba, Argentina
Association football forwards
Argentine expatriate sportspeople in Greece
Argentine expatriate sportspeople in France
Expatriate footballers in France
Expatriate footballers in Greece
Argentine expatriate footballers